Mauvais Sang (Bad Blood), also known as The Night Is Young, is Leos Carax's second film. Released in 1986, the film played at the 37th Berlin International Film Festival before being nominated for three César Awards and winning the Prix Louis-Delluc. The film sold 504,803 tickets in France. The title refers to Arthur Rimbaud's eponymous poem in A Season in Hell.

In the movie, a sexually transmitted disease called STBO is sweeping the country; it spreads by sex without emotional involvement, and most of its victims are young people who have sex out of curiosity rather than commitment. A woman hires two men to steal the serum, which has been locked away in a pharmaceutical company's offices.

Plot
In the Paris of the not-too-distant future, a mysterious disease, STBO, is killing people who have sex without emotional involvement. A serum has been developed, but it is locked away out of the reach of those who need it. An American woman blackmails two aging crooks, Marc and Hans, into stealing it.  Marc recruits Alex, a rebellious teenager whose father worked for him before his death. Alex has a girlfriend, Lise, but falls for Marc's lover, Anna.

Cast

Production
Julie Delpy has said she came out of filming this movie traumatized: "It was a very difficult shoot. I had a motorcycle accident. In order to make the insurance work, I wasn't taken to the doctor right away. As a result, my leg became gangrenous—one more day and it was amputation. Moreover Leos Carax was not easy. The actress was not easy either."

Accolades

Berlin Film Festival 1987
 Nominated for Golden Bear Award
 Winner of Alfred Bauer Prize
 Winner of C.I.C.A.E. Award

César Awards 1987
 Nominated for Best Actress - Juliette Binoche
 Most Promising Actress - Julie Delpy
 Nominated for Best Cinematography - Jean-Yves Escoffier

Louis Delluc Prize 1986
 Best Film

Production
Christian Faure was the assistant director of the movie.

References

External links 
 

1986 films
1980s crime films
French crime films
1980s French-language films
Films directed by Leos Carax
Louis Delluc Prize winners
Fiction about Halley's Comet
1980s French films